Albert Charles Wollenberg (June 13, 1900 – April 19, 1981) was a United States district judge of the United States District Court for the Northern District of California.

Education and career

Born in San Francisco, California, Wollenberg received an Artium Baccalaureus degree from the University of California, Berkeley in 1922 and a Juris Doctor from the UC Berkeley School of Law in 1924. He was in private practice in San Francisco from 1924 to 1927, and was an Assistant United States Attorney of the Northern District of California from 1927 to 1934, returning to private practice in San Francisco until 1947. He was a member of the California State Assembly for the 27th and 21st district from 1939 to 1947, when he became a Judge of the Superior Court of California for the City and County of San Francisco.

Federal judicial service

On April 24, 1958, Wollenberg was nominated by President Dwight D. Eisenhower to a seat on the United States District Court for the Northern District of California vacated by Judge Michael Joseph Roche. Wollenberg was confirmed by the United States Senate on May 15, 1958, and received his commission on May 19, 1958. He was a member of the Judicial Conference of the United States from 1966 to 1969. He assumed senior status on April 30, 1975. Wollenberg served in that capacity until his death on April 19, 1981, in San Francisco.

See also
List of Jewish American jurists

References

Sources
 

1900 births
1981 deaths
California state court judges
Members of the California State Assembly
Judges of the United States District Court for the Northern District of California
United States district court judges appointed by Dwight D. Eisenhower
20th-century American judges
20th-century American lawyers
UC Berkeley School of Law alumni
Assistant United States Attorneys
20th-century American politicians